The Servian Wall was an ancient Roman defensive barrier constructed around the city of Rome in the early 4th century BC. In the 3rd century AD it was superseded by the construction of the larger Aurelian Walls as the city of Rome grew beyond the boundary of the Servian Wall.

History
The wall is named after the sixth Roman King, Servius Tullius. The literary tradition stating that there was some type of defensive wall or earthen works that encircled the city of Rome dating to the 6th century BC has been found to be false. The main extent of the Servian Wall was built in the early 4th century, during what is known as the Roman Republic.

Construction
The Servian Wall was originally built from large blocks of Cappellaccio tuff (a volcanic rock made from ash and rock fragments that are ejected during a volcanic eruption) that was quarried from Alban Hills volcanic complex.  This initial wall of Cappellaccio tuff was partially damaged and in need of restoration by the late 390s (either because of rapid disintegration or damage sustained after the Sack of Rome in 390 BC). These reparations were done using the superior Grotta Oscura tuff which had become available after the Romans had defeated Veii in the 390s. This tuff was quarried by the vanquished Veientines. In addition to the tuff blocks, some sections of the structure incorporated a deep fossa, or a ditch, in front of the wall, as a means to effectively heighten the wall. This second iteration of the wall containing Grotta Oscura tuff is dated by Livy to have been completed in 378 BC.

Along part of the topographically weaker Northern perimeter was an agger, a defensive ramp of earth that was built up along the inside of the Servian Wall. This effectively thickened the wall and also gave the defenders of Rome a base to stand while repelling an attack. The wall was also outfitted with defensive war engines, including catapults.

Usage
The Servian Wall was maintained through the end of the Late Republic and into the Roman Empire. By this time, Rome had already begun to outgrow the original boundaries of the Servian Wall.

The Servian Wall became unnecessary as Rome became well protected by the ever-expanding strength of the field armies of the Republic and of the later Empire. As the city continued to grow and prosper, Rome was essentially unwalled for the first three centuries of the Empire. Expanding domestic structures simply incorporated existing wall sections into their foundations, an example of which survives in the Auditorium of Maecenas. When German tribes made further incursions along the Roman frontier in the 3rd century AD, Emperor Aurelian had the larger Aurelian Walls built to protect the city of Rome.

Present day

Several sections of the Servian Wall are still visible in various locations around the city of Rome. The largest section is preserved outside the Termini Station, the main railway station in Rome – including a section in a McDonald's dining area at the station. Another notable section on the Aventine Hill incorporates an arch that was supposedly for a defensive catapult from the late Republic.

Gates along the Servian Wall

The following lists the gates that are believed to have been built, clockwise from the westernmost. (Many of these are inferred only from writings, with no known remains.)

 Porta Flumentana – this gate was where the via Aurelia entered Rome after crossing the Tiber River.
 Porta Carmentalis – the western end of the Capitoline.
 Porta Fontinalis – led from the northern end of the Capitoline into the Campus Martius along the via Lata.
 Porta Sanqualis – on the Quirinal.
 Porta Salutaris – on the Quirinal.
 Porta Quirinalis – on the Quirinal.
 Porta Collina – the northernmost gate, on the Quirinal, leading to the via Salaria. Hannibal camped his army within sight of this gate when he considered besieging Rome in 211 BC. This section was fortified additionally with the agger.
 Porta Viminalis – on the Viminal. This is near the large section still visible outside Termini Station.
 Porta Esquilina – this gate on the Esquiline is still visible, and incorporates the later arch of the emperor Gallienus. It led to the via Labicana, via Praenestina and via Tiburtina.
 Porta Querquetulana – this led to the via Tusculana.
 Porta Caelimontana – this gate is perhaps preserved in the Arch of Dolabella and Silanus, which was the reconstruction of an existing gate in 10 AD by the consuls Dolabella and Silanus.
 Porta Capena – this was the gate through which the via Appia left Rome to southern Italy after separating from the via Latina.
 Porta Naevia – this gate on the Aventine led to the via Ardeatina.
 Porta Raudusculana – headed south along the Tiber River along the via Ostiensis. Near here, on the modern viale Aventino, may be found a section of the wall incorporating an arch for a catapult.
 Porta Lavernalis – also joined up with the via Ostiensis.
 Porta Trigemina – this triple gate near the Forum Boarium  also led to the via Ostiensis.

Gallery

See also
 Museum of the Walls, Rome

References

Bibliography
 
 Carandini, A., P. Carafa, Italy, and Università degli studi di Roma “La Sapienza.,” eds. 2012. Atlante di Roma antica: biografia e ritratti della città. Milano: Electa.
 
 
 
 Claridge, Amanda. Rome: An Oxford Archaeological Guide. 2nd ed. Oxford, UK: Oxford UP, 2010. Oxford Archaeological Guides
 
 Forsythe, Gary. 2005. A Critical History of Early Rome: From Prehistory to the First Punic War. Berkeley: University of California Press
 Holleran, C., and A. Claridge, eds. 2018. A companion to the city of Rome. Blackwell companions to the ancient world. Hoboken, NJ: John Wiley & Sons, Inc.
 
 Showerman, Grant. 1969. Rome and the Romans: A Survey and Interpretation. New York: Cooper Square

External links 
Servian Wall entry on the Lacus Curtius website
Lacus Curtius page including gates in the Servian Wall
Map showing the "Servian" wall based on new research results
 

Buildings and structures completed in the 4th century BC
Tourist attractions in Rome
Walls of Rome
4th-century BC establishments in Italy
Roman walls in Italy